The Katosan is a town and former Princely State in Jotana Taluka of Mehsana district, Gujarat, India.

The Bhagwanji Koli of Katosan state who was a able ruler of Katosan, raised the Kolis of Katosan Thana against British Raj during Rebellion of 1857 in Gujarat but he was forced by Rehvari Rajputs and Marwadi Banias to putt down the arms against British rule but he refused and fought against local Rajput chiefs and British officials.

History 
Katosan was a Fourth Class princely state and taluka, comprising five more villages, covering ten square miles in Mahi Kantha Agency, ruled by Makwana Koli chieftains who used the title of Thakor.

It had a combined population of 5,510 in 1901, yielding a state revenue of 26,617 Rupees (some three quarters from land), paying a tribute of 4,893 Rupees to the Gaikwar Baroda State, supplemented by fixed tribute sums for Baroda from individual villages belonging entirely to Katosan state: 430 Rupees from Nadasa, 623 Rupees from Jakasna, 96 Rupees from Ajabpura, 139 Rupees from Gamanpura and 3,580 Rupees from Jotana.

On 10 July 1943, Katosan ceased to exist, being among the princely states merging under the "Attachment Scheme" into the Gaekwad Baroda State; some petty estates within the Katosan thana had been similarly merged on 1 February 1940. Thereafter, Baroda became a part of independent India's Bombay State and, still later, Gujarat. Surendrasinhji Kirtisinhji of Katosan in Jotana taluka died on Sunday at the age of 70 from a heart attack. He was the last prince of Katosan State.

References

Princely states of Gujarat
Koli princely states